Rhodiola rosea (commonly golden root, rose root, roseroot, Aaron's rod, Arctic root, king's crown, lignum rhodium, orpin rose) is a perennial flowering plant in the family Crassulaceae. It grows naturally in wild Arctic regions of Europe (including Britain), Asia, and North America ( N.B., Nfld. and Labrador, N.S., QC.; Alaska, Maine, N.Y., N.C., Pa., Vt), and can be propagated as a groundcover. 

Although Rhodiola rosea has been used in traditional medicine, there is no high-quality clinical evidence of its effectiveness to treat any disease. The United States Food and Drug Administration has issued several warnings to manufacturers of R. rosea dietary supplements for making false health claims about its safety and efficacy.

The plant is threatened in many countries due to rapidly growing demand. Supply comes mostly from wild harvesting on an industrial scale, and a combination of growing scarcity and a lack of regulation has led to environmental degradation, substitution or adulteration in the market, and illegal harvesting in protected areas.

Description
Several shoots growing from the same thick root may reach  in height. R. rosea is dioecious – having separate female and male plants.

Taxonomy 
Rhodiola rosea was first described by Pedanius Dioscorides in De Materia Medica. Many North American plants formerly included in R. rosea are now treated separately as Rhodiola integrifolia and Rhodiola rhodantha.

Chemical constituents
About 140 chemical compounds are in the subterranean portions of R. rosea. Rhodiola roots contain phenols, rosavin, rosin, rosarin, organic acids, terpenoids, phenolic acids and their derivatives, flavonoids, anthraquinones, alkaloids, tyrosol, and salidroside.

The chemical composition of the essential oil from R. rosea root growing in different countries varies. For example, rosavin, rosarin, and rosin at their highest concentration according to many tests can be found only in R. rosea of Russian origin; the main component of the essential oil from Rhodiola growing in Bulgaria are geraniol and myrtenol; in China the main components are geraniol and 1-octanol; and in India the main component is phenethyl alcohol.  Cinnamyl alcohol was discovered only in the sample from Bulgaria.

Although rosavin, rosarin, rosin, and salidroside (and sometimes p-tyrosol, rhodioniside, rhodiolin, and rosiridin) are among suspected active ingredients of R. rosea, these compounds are mostly polyphenols. There are no peer reviewed studies demonstrating that these chemicals have any physiological effect in humans that could prevent or reduce risk of disease. Although these phytochemicals are typically mentioned as specific to Rhodiola rosea extracts, rosea and other Rhodiola species contain many other constituent polyphenols, including proanthocyanidins, quercetin, gallic acid, chlorogenic acid and kaempferol.

Distribution
Rhodiola rosea grows in cold regions of the world, including much of the Arctic, the mountains of Central Asia, scattered in eastern North America and mountainous parts of Europe. It grows on sea cliffs and on mountains at high altitude.

Uses

Culinary use
The leaves and shoots are eaten raw, having a bitter flavor, or cooked like spinach, and are sometimes added to salads.  An extract is sometimes added as a flavoring in vodkas.

Research and regulation
Through 2019, human studies evaluating R. rosea did not have sufficient quality to determine whether it has properties affecting fatigue or any other condition. The U.S. Food and Drug Administration (FDA) has issued warning letters to manufacturers of R. rosea dietary supplement products unapproved as new drugs, adulterated, misbranded and in federal violation for not having proof of safety or efficacy for the advertised conditions of alleviating Raynaud syndrome, altitude sickness, depression or cancer.

Traditional medicine
In Russia and Scandinavia, R. rosea has been used for centuries to cope with the cold Siberian climate and stressful life. It is also used to increase physical endurance and resistance to high-altitude sickness, but the scientific evidence for such benefits is weak. The plant has been used in traditional Chinese medicine, where it is called hóng jǐng tiān.

A 2012 report by the European Medicines Agency on literature concerning the dried extract of R. rosea stated that "The published clinical trials exhibit considerable deficiencies in their quality. Therefore 'well-established use' cannot be accepted" and added: "The traditional use as an adaptogen 'for temporary relief of symptoms of stress such as fatigue and sensation of weakness' is appropriate for traditional herbal medicinal products. ... The long-standing use as well as the outcome of the clinical trials support the plausibility of the use of the mentioned herbal preparation in the proposed indication."

See also
 Rhodiola
 Rhodiola integrifolia

References

External links
 
 Rhodiola Rosea benefits explained

Crassulaceae
Alpine flora
Flora of the Alps
Flora of the Pyrenees
Flora of Europe
Flora of Pakistan
Flora of Colorado
Flora of the Rocky Mountains
Monoamine oxidase inhibitors
Medicinal plants
Plants described in 1753
Taxa named by Carl Linnaeus
Dioecious plants